There are several lakes named Mud Lake within the Canadian province of Newfoundland and Labrador.

 Mud Lake, located east of Happy Valley-Goose Bay, Newfoundland and Labrador, near the mouth of the Churchill River. 
 Mud Lake, located north of Botwood, Newfoundland and Labrador.

References
 Canadian Geographical Names Data Base

Lakes of Newfoundland and Labrador